Rrahul Sudhir is an Indian television actor. He is best known for portraying Vansh Raisinghania in Ishq Mein Marjawan 2.

Personal life
Rrahul hails from Kashmir.

Career 
Rrahul Sudhir began his acting career in 2015. In 2016, he played a minor role in Amit Khanna's webshow All about Section 377. Subsequently, he acted in various web shows such as Gehraiyaan, Maaya and Spotlight before landing a major role in the 2017 web series Twisted as inspector Aryan Mathur. He went on to play the lead in the second season as the same character.

He debuted on television in 2019 with Zee TV's Rajaa Betaa as Dr. Vedant Tripathi but had to quit the show after months owing to his mother's health.

He portrayed Vansh Raisinghania  in Ishq Mein Marjawan 2 opposite Helly Shah and Vishal Vashishtha, that aired from 13 July 2020 to 13 March 2021 on Colors TV. After the show went off air, the new season titled Ishq Mein Marjawan 2: Naya Safar began to stream on Voot Select since 15 March, with Rrahul reprising the character of Vansh.

He has done his first short film named Ishqiyaat which was released on 14 February 2022 with Aalisha Panwar. Its shooting was done in Manali, Himachal Pradesh.

Filmography

Television

Web series

Short film

Awards and nominations

References

Indian male television actors
Male actors in Hindi television
Indian male soap opera actors
21st-century Indian male actors
Living people
Year of birth missing (living people)